Cementarnica Stadion (Macedonian Cyrillic: Стадион Цементарница) is a multi-purpose stadium in Skopje, North Macedonia.  It is currently used mostly for football matches and is the home stadium of FK Cementarnica 55 and FK Gorno Lisiče.  The stadium holds 2,000 people.

References

External links
Macedonian Football 
Football Federation of Macedonia 

Football venues in North Macedonia
Stadium
C
Multi-purpose stadiums in North Macedonia